Journal de la Corse is a weekly publication ("hebdomadaire"), which was founded on 1 November 1817 and located in Ajaccio in southern Corsica.

References

Mass media in Ajaccio
Organizations based in Corsica
Publications established in 1817
Weekly newspapers published in France